Crematogaster apicalis is a species of ant in tribe Crematogastrini. It was described by Motschoulsky in 1878.

References

apicalis
Insects described in 1878